Hikmat Muhammad Karim (born 20 August 1954, Khanaqin), known as Mala Bakhtiyar or Mala Bakhtiar, is a political leader and a Senior Iraqi Kurdish politician. He is a commander and General of the Kurdish PUK Peshmerga forces and is considered one of the most powerful people in iraq. Mala Bakhtiar is the former chief of the executive bureau of the patriotic union of Kurdistan. He is now the Joint leader of the Supreme political council of the Patriotic Union of Kurdistan (PUK), alongside Kosrat Rasul Ali. Mala Bakhtiar was awarded a medal for being the best national and intellectual figure of the middle east by the International Union of Economists and Managers in the European Union and was recognized as an international democratic figure in 2014. His power is on the rise after the PUK held its 4th congress on the 19th of December 2019, during which he was elected into the Supreme Political Council of the PUK. In November 2021, it was reported that he was being treated after being poisoned. On the 13th of November 2021, after receiving treatment in Berlin, Germany, he returned to Sulaimaniyah, Kurdistan, where he received a Hero’s welcome.

Books and publications                                                                                                                                                                                                           

 "Kurdish Revolution and Modern Changes","published in 1992.
 "Becoming Rebellious to History," Second Edition in 1998.
 "At service of Literature," 1998.
 "Democracy after Cold War," published in 1999.
 "Collection of Some Topics," published in 1999.
 "Democracy between Modernism and Post-modernism," published in 2000.
 "Rational Freedom and Civil Society" in 2001.
 "Democracy and its Enemies" First Edition in 2006, and the second edition in 2014.
 "A Bunch of History of Kurdistan Toilers Party, or Komala in 2012.
 "Spiritual Totalitarianism and Duties of Modern Enlightenment, A Response to Secretary-General of Kurdistan Islamic Union’s Report in 2013.
 "Anaka Discourse and Turning of Contemporary Kurdish Struggle," booklet, in 2013.
 A Group of Essays on the 38th anniversary of PUK.
 "Intersection of Democracy and Salafism," first edition, 2014.
 "Modern Political Roadmap in the Middle East," in 2014.
 "Kurdistan Revolutions and Modern Changes," in 2015.
 Kurdistan, HDP and Turkey, Towards Which Political Harbor?
 ISIS, Expectations of its Emergence and Its Risks.

References

External links
 Mala Bakhtiar's account page on Facebook

1954 births
Living people
Patriotic Union of Kurdistan politicians
People from Khanaqin
Kurdish writers
Kurdish male writers
Critics of Islamism
Critics of atheism
Iraqi secularists